The Contender Australia is a reality television show based on the sport of boxing, but with an added element of insight into the competitor's lives and relationships with each other within the show's living quarters.  The series was filmed in Sydney, Australia and was first aired on Australian Pay-Television channel Fox8 on 3 November 2009. The winner will win the Contender Australia title and a A$250,000 prize-"fight" with Anthony Mundine.

Contestants
The following 14 fighters, hailing from Australia and New Zealand, were selected to take part in the Contender Tournament which took place at the Super Middleweight division.

Records entering tournament in parentheses (W-L-D)

Ben "The Juicer" McCulloch(3(2 by KO)-0-0)
Adrian Taihia(5(3 by KO)-0-1)
Israel "Cobra" Kani (9(4 by KO)-2-2)
Josh "Cast Iron" Clenshaw (26(13 by KO)-16-0)
Daniel MacKinnon (13(7 by KO)-4-1)
Garth "From the Hood" Wood (4(2 by KO)-1-0)
Junior "The One" Talipeau (14(5 by KO)-0-0)
Kariz "Peter" Kariuki (18(17 by KO)-7-2)
Les "Diamond" Piper (10(2 by KO)-2-3)
Luke "Kool Hand" Moloney (13-4-0)
Sonni "Jungle Boy" Michael Angelo (15(5 by KO)-8-2)
Victor "The Crushin Russian" Oganov (28(28 by KO)-2-0)
Pradeep "The Indian Warrior" Singh(15(8 by KO)-1-1)
Nader "Lionheart" Hamdan (41(18 by KO)-6-0)

Trainers
Billy Hussien (Blue Team)
Paul Briggs (Gold Team)

Hosts

 Charlotte Dawson
 Daniel Amalm

Guest appearances

 Sakio Bika
 Joe Bugner
 Sugar Ray Leonard
 Anthony Mundine

Fight results

Episode 1 
Josh Clenshaw defeated Israel Kani by split decision.
Garth Wood and Ben McCulloch qualified for Round 2 through winning the challenge.
Blue Team 0, Gold Team 1

Episode 2
Daniel MacKinnon defeated Luke Moloney by 3rd round KO.
Blue Team 0, Gold Team 2

Episode 3
Nader Hamden defeated Les Piper by a Unanimous decision.
Blue Team 1, Gold Team 2

Episode 4
Victor Oganov defeats Junior Talipeau by Majority decision.
48-48 | 48-47 | 48-47
Blue Team 2, Gold Team 2

Episode 5
Kariz Kariuki defeated Adrian Taihia by 2nd round KO.
Sonni Michael Angelo defeated Pradeep Singh by Unanimous decision
48-47 | 49-48 | 49-46
Blue Team 2, Gold Team 4

Episode 6
Ben McCulloch leaves the house due to neck injury from the advice of his physio
Israel Kani replaces Ben McCulloch and is now fighting Garth Wood
The fighters meet up with Sugar Ray Leonard
Garth Wood defeated Israel Kani by 2nd round KO.

Episode 7
Victor Oganov defeats Sonni Michael Angelo by Unanimous Decision
49-45 | 49-46 | 48-46

Episode 8
Josh Clenshaw defeats Daniel MacKinnon by Majority Decision
48-48 | 48-47 | 50-45

Episode 9
Kariz Kariuki defeats Nader Hamden by Unanimous Decision.
49-46 | 48-46 | 49-45

Episode 10
Garth Woods defeats Victor Oganov by Majority Points Decision.
Kariz Kariuki defeats Josh Clenshaw by Unanimous Decision.

See also

Boxing in Australia

References

External links

2009 Australian television seasons
2010 Australian television seasons
Australia
2009 Australian television series debuts
2010 Australian television series endings
2000s Australian reality television series
Boxing in Australia
Fox8 original programming
Sport in Sydney
Television series by ITV Studios
Television shows set in Sydney
Australian television series based on American television series
2010s Australian reality television series